U.S. 1 was a Marvel Comics comic book series that debuted in 1983. The series was produced based on a license of the US-1 Trucks slot truck toyline from Tyco Toys.

Publication history
U.S. 1 lasted for 12 issues (May 1983 - October 1984).  It was among the first line of books edited by Ralph Macchio, and Bob Harras later worked on the title. Al Milgrom wrote the series, with artwork provided by Marvel veterans Herb Trimpe, Frank Springer and Steve Ditko.

Characters
Ulysses Solomon Archer (U.S. Archer), the main character of the series.
Mary McGrill, waitress at the Short Stop Diner. She also had an alternate personality, the villainess Midnight, who used a mind-controlling bullwhip.
Ed "Poppa Wheelie" Wheeler and "Wide Load Annie" Wheeler, operators of the Short Stop Diner.
Jefferson Archer (Highwayman), U.S.'s brother who turned to evil.
Baron Von Blimp, a villain based out of a dirigible.

Reception

Screen Rant ranked Ulysses Archer (and series villain The Highwayman) as one of the superheroes that Marvel wants you to forget.

References

External links
 

1983 comics debuts
1984 comics endings
Marvel Comics titles